Berkin Elvan (5 January 1999 – 11 March 2014) was a 15-year-old boy who was hit on the head by a tear-gas canister fired by a police officer in Istanbul during the June 2013 anti-government protests in Turkey. He died on March 11, 2014. Lawyers representing the family said Elvan's condition worsened over the last week of his life, with his weight dropping to 16 kg from 45 kg. Widespread demonstrations erupted following Berkin's death.

He was buried at the Feriköy Cemetery, Istanbul.

His father was from Tokat, while his mother was from Tunceli.

Events 
On the 16 June 2013, Berkin Elvan was in an area where the Gezi Park protests unfolded near his home in Okmeydanı, Istanbul. That day his mother wanted to go out and buy bread, but Berkin bravely said that the streets were too dangerous and because he was younger, he could run faster in case of an emergency. Thats when he was hit on the head by a tear gas canister thrown by the police officer Fatih Dalgalı. However, in another report sent to the Istanbul Chief Public Prosecutor's Office, it was stated that he was found to be carrying explosives when he was brought to the Okmeydanı Training and Research Hospital. He fell into coma and died after 269 days on the 11 March 2014. His funeral was held in Istanbul on March 12 and attended by thousands of people. He was buried at the Feriköy Cemetery, Istanbul.

Investigation and trial 
On 12 March 2014, four police officers testified for the ongoing investigation concerning the case of Berkin Elvan's injury during the Gezi protests. Overall, 18 police officers have testified as suspects under the investigation so far, including these four. The prosecution evaluated the footage of the surveillance cameras for three years until they were able to identify and prosecute Dalgalı. He was prosecuted for manslaughter on the 6 April 2017, but the court decided not to issue an arrest warrant for Dalgalı. On 3 February 2020, the gendarmery issued a report mentioning that Elvan was partly to blame for his own death, since he was in an area of protests. After two more hearings in 2021, Dalgalı was sentenced to 16 years and 8 months in prison, but the court abstained from ordering an arrest for Dalgalı.

Protests 
Following Elvan's death, protests erupted throughout Turkey in  Adana, Adıyaman, Antalya, Ankara, Ardahan, Bursa, Bolu, Çorum Düzce, Edirne, Gaziantep, İstanbul, İzmir, Konya, Hatay, Malatya, Sivas, Şanlıurfa, Şırnak, Kayseri, Tunceli, Tokat, Zonguldak and worldwide in cities such as Nuremberg, London, Paris, Vienna, Helsinki, Strasbourg, Stockholm, New York City, Boston, Washington DC, Amsterdam, Barcelona, Bielefeld, Berlin, Brussels, The Hague, Dresden, Duisburg, Frankfurt, Hamburg, Cologne, Lausanne, Lisbon, Rotterdam, Stuttgart, Warsaw, Seattle, Pennsylvania, Toronto.

Reactions 
Turkish Prime Minister Recep Tayyip Erdoğan claimed that the boy was a "member of a terrorist organization" as he had his face covered by a scarf. Berkin was known to disagree with the governments actions. 

In March 2014, Maoist rebels attacked a police station in Tunceli in revenge for Elvan's killing.

On 31 March 2015, suspected members of the Revolutionary People's Liberation Party-Front (DHKP-C) took prosecutor Mehmet Selim Kiraz hostage on the sixth floor of the Istanbul Justice Palace. They demanded that the police announce the names of four members of the security services who they said were connected to the death of Berkin Elvan. The police negotiated with the gunmen for six hours, but eventually stormed the courthouse "because of gunshots heard from inside the prosecutor's office". The two gunmen died during the operation, while the prosecutor was badly wounded and later died of his injuries.

See also
 2013 protests in Turkey

References

External links 

  

1999 births
2014 deaths
2013 murders in Turkey
2013 in Istanbul 
2014 in Istanbul 
March 2014 events in Turkey
2014 murders in Turkey
Burials at Feriköy Cemetery
Gezi Park protests
Kurdish Alevis
Kurdish murder victims
Murdered Turkish children
People murdered in Turkey
Victims of police brutality
Turkish Alevis
Turkish murder victims
Incidents of violence against boys
Police brutality in Turkey